Euchaetes bicolor is a moth of the family Erebidae. It was described by Walter Rothschild in 1935. It is found in São Paulo, Brazil.

References

 Arctiidae genus list at Butterflies and Moths of the World of the Natural History Museum

Phaegopterina
Moths described in 1935